Johnathan McClain (born in Myrtle Beach, South Carolina) is an American actor and screenwriter.

Career
At the age of 21 McClain moved to Chicago where he wrote and began performing his critically acclaimed, multiple character, one-man show, "Like It Is."  The Chicago Reader was quoted as saying:  “If we’re ever to return to a day when theatre matters, we’ll need a few hundred more artists with McClain’s vision and courage.”  The show subsequently moved to New York, where his work was compared to that of Eric Bogosian, John Leguizamo, and Anna Deavere Smith.

McClain continued to pursue stage acting for a number of years in New York City and his work there includes appearing Off-Broadway in the original cast of Jonathan Tolins’ "The Last Sunday In June" at The Rattlestick Playwrights Theater and later in its transfer to The Century Center for the Performing Arts, as well as at Lincoln Center Theater and with the Lincoln Center Director’s Lab.  Around the country, he has been seen on stage at the American Conservatory Theater, South Coast Repertory, Florida Stage, Paper Mill Playhouse, and the National Jewish Theatre, as well as at various theatres in Los Angeles.

In 2004 he booked a lead in the Jessica Simpson pilot for ABC, and over the next several years made a number of guest appearances on television.  In 2010 he was cast as the lead in TV Land's second original comedy series Retired at 35 which premiered on January 19, 2011, at 10:30 pm following Hot in Cleveland.

He has also worked as a contributor to the Public Radio International series Fair Game (radio).

Personal life
McClain is originally from South Carolina and is active in the world of slam poetry. He and his wife, Laura, divide their time between New York and Los Angeles.

Filmography

Audiobook work
In 2012, New York Times bestselling author Lincoln Child's audiobook recording of The Third Gate was released for which Johnathan McClain was the narrator. AudioFile magazine reviewed it positively saying, "McClain enhances the narrative passages about the history of Egyptian royalty with deft pacing." Later that year, McClain continued his audiobook narrating with Christopher Krovatin's YA novel, Mountain of Bones: Gravediggers, Book 1, as well as three books from the Jack Reacher series by Lee Child: Die Trying (novel), Tripwire (novel), and  Running Blind''.

References

External links

 Johnathan McClain on tvland.com

Living people
American male stage actors
American male television actors
Year of birth missing (living people)
Male actors from South Carolina
People from Myrtle Beach, South Carolina